Totentanz, or Danse Macabre, is a genre of allegory from the Late Middle Ages on the universality of death.

Totentanz may also refer to:

 Totentanz (Adès), a 2013 composition for voice and orchestra by Thomas Adès
 Totentanz (Distler), a 1934 composition of 14 motets by Hugo Distler
 Totentanz (Liszt), an 1849 composition for piano and orchestra by Franz Liszt

See also 
 Dance of Death (disambiguation)
 Dance of the Dead (disambiguation)
 Danse Macabre (disambiguation)